The 2019–20 FAW Welsh Cup was the 133nd season of the annual knockout tournament for competitive football teams in Wales.

First qualifying round

North

|-
!colspan="3" align="center"|31 August

  

|}

Central

|-
!colspan="3" align="center"|31 August

|}

South

|-
!colspan="3" align="center"|31 August

|}

Notes

Second qualifying round

Northeast

|-
!colspan="3" align="center"|28 September

|-
!colspan="3" align="center"|5 October

|}

Northwest

|-
!colspan="3" align="center"|28 September

 

|}

Central

|-
!colspan="3" align="center"|27 September

|-
!colspan="3" align="center"|28 September

|-
!colspan="3" align="center"|5 October

|}

Southeast

|-
!colspan="3" align="center"|27 September

|-
!colspan="3" align="center"|28 September

|-
!colspan="3" align="center"|5 October

|}

Southwest

|-
!colspan="3" align="center"|28 September

|}

Notes

First round

North

|-
!colspan="3" align="center"|19 October

|-
!colspan="3" align="center"|29 October

|-
!colspan="3" align="center"|2 November

|}

South

|-
!colspan="3" align="center"|18 October

|-
!colspan="3" align="center"|19 October

|-
!colspan="3" align="center"|23 October

|}

Notes

Second round
The draw took place on 21 October 2019 with Cambrian & Clydach Vale joining the competition in addition to the winners from round 1.

North

|-
!colspan="3" align="center"|9 November 2019

|}

South

|-
!colspan="3" align="center"|9 November 2019

|-
!colspan="3" align="center"|16 November

|}

Notes

Third round
Clubs from the Cymru Premier joined the competition in this round. Ties to be played the weekend of 7 December 2019. The lowest ranked team still in the competition, Abertillery Bluebirds, from the fourth tier lost to the leaders of the top division, Connah's Quay Nomads. Another team from outside the top two divisions, Mold Alexandra from the third tier, lost to Welsh Cup champions, The New Saints.

|-
!colspan="3" align="center"|6 December 2019

|-
!colspan="3" align="center"|7 December 2019

|-
!colspan="3" align="center"|14 December 2019

|}

Notes

Fourth round
The draw was made on 9 December with the club from the lowest remaining tier Pontardawe Town, drawn away to Cymru Premier side Cefn Druids.

|-
!colspan="3" align="center"|24 January 2020

|-
!colspan="3" align="center"|25 January 2020

|}

Notes

Quarter-finals
Ties were played between 28 February and 3 March. 

|-
!colspan="3" align="center"|28 February 2020

|-
!colspan="3" align="center"|1 March 2020

|-
!colspan="3" align="center"|3 March 2020

|}

Notes

Semi-finals
The remainder of the competition had been postponed by the Football Association of Wales due to the COVID-19 pandemic, until "it is safe and economically viable to resume". On 30 July 2020, the remainder of the competition was cancelled.

|-
!colspan="3" align="center"|TBC

|} 

Notes

Final
Cancelled.

References

2019–20
2019–20 European domestic association football cups
Cup
Association football events curtailed and voided due to the COVID-19 pandemic